Joseph V. Zord, Jr. (May 2, 1910 – February 7, 1994) was a Republican member of the Pennsylvania House of Representatives.

References

Republican Party members of the Pennsylvania House of Representatives
1910 births
1994 deaths
20th-century American politicians